Mukhosh is a Bengali thriller drama film directed by Argha Deep Chatterjee and produced by Suman Sengupta. The film starring Payel Sarkar and Rajatava Dutta was released on 3 January 2020 under the banner of SSG Entertainment.

Plot
Ranajay is an industrialist and influential person. He joins into politics. One day his wife goes missing and his sister-in-law Amrita doubts him responsible for her mysterious disappearance. She complains to police. Police inspector Sabyasachi Banerjee investigates the case.

Cast
 Rajatava Dutta as Ranajay
 Payel Sarkar as Amrita
 Shantilal Mukherjee as Sabyasachi Banerjee
 Prantik Banerjee
 Amrita Halder

References

External links 
 

2020 films
Bengali-language Indian films
Indian thriller drama films
2020 thriller drama films